Tommaso Foschi (died 1514) was a Roman Catholic prelate who served as Bishop of Comacchio (1506–1514).

Biography
Tommaso Foschi was born in Ferrara, Italy. 
On 14 October 1506, Tommaso Foschi was appointed during the papacy of Pope Julius II as Bishop of Comacchio.
He served as Bishop of Comacchio until his death in 1514.

References

External links and additional sources
 (for Chronology of Bishops) 
 (for Chronology of Bishops) 

16th-century Italian Roman Catholic bishops
Bishops appointed by Pope Julius II
1514 deaths